Panthea Grant Boone Boggs (September 20, 1801 – September 23, 1880) was the First Lady of Missouri from 1836 until 1840.  She was also a granddaughter of American pioneer Daniel Boone. She was married to Lilburn Boggs who served as the sixth Governor of Missouri from 1836 to 1840. They spent the first 23 years of their marriage living in Jackson County, Missouri. After Boggs served as governor, they moved to California in 1846 where they planned to retire, but where the former governor served as alcalde, local postmaster, and in the California state assembly.

Governor Boggs was previously married to Julia Bent, a daughter of Judge Silas Bent. They were married from 1817 until her death in 1820.

References

External links

1801 births
1880 deaths
First Ladies and Gentlemen of Missouri
People from Greenup, Kentucky
People from Jackson County, Missouri
People from Napa County, California
Daniel Boone